= Zapparia =

Ancient city in Assyrian period in Iraqi Kurdistan

Zapparia or Kar Sipar, was an ancient city in Assyrian period located in modern Zebari region in Iraqi Kurdistan.
